The QuickSilver project at Cornell University is an  AFRL-funded effort to build a platform in support of a new generation of scalable, secure, reliable distributed computing applications able to "regenerate" themselves after failure.
Among the partners on this project are DARPA funding under the SRS program,  the United States Air Force. Raytheon,  Microsoft, IBM, and Amazon.

The principal investigators are Cornell Professors Kenneth P. Birman,   Johannes Gehrke, and Paul Francis

External links
 Project home page with links to the over 140 published papers from 1999-2006.

DARPA